Johannes Falkenberg (1 April 1911 in Oslo - June 3, 2004, same place) was a Norwegian social anthropologist.

Falkenberg was linked to the University of Oslos ethnographic museum the most of his life, where he was a curator in ethnographic from 1953. Falkenberg studied at the University of Oslo and took "Geography with ethnographic" under professor Ole Solberg. Due to his education he travelled to inner Laksefjord in 1938, where he performed examinations of Sami settlements. That resulted in the dissertation "Settlements along the inner Laksefjord in Finnmark" (1941).

As a reserve officer he came into captivity in Germany, which, via a coprisoner from the Australian "outback" resulted in a fascination to the indigenous people, so Falkenberg decided that he wanted to do research among the natives in Australia. He became a curator at the ethnographic museum by his homecoming in 1945, and wrote the book "Et steinalderfolk i vår tid" in 1948. Falkenberg then chose the Murinbata people in Port Keats in North Australia for his field research in 1950. This resulted in a solid study that Claude Lévi-Strauss himself quoted from.

Social anthropologists
Academics from Oslo
1911 births
2004 deaths